The canton of Approuague-Kaw is one of the former cantons of the Guyane department in French Guiana. It was located in the arrondissement of Cayenne. Its administrative seat was located in Régina, the canton's only commune. Its population was 934 in 2012.

Administration

References

Cantons of Guyane